United Nations Security Council resolution 252, adopted on 21 May 1968, after a letter from the Permanent Representative of Jordan, hearing statements from Israel and Jordan, and noting Israel's "further actions and measures in contravention" of General Assembly resolutions, the Council reaffirmed that the acquisition of territory by military conquest is inadmissible and deplored the failure of Israel to comply with the General Assembly resolutions.  The Council considered all legislative and administrative measure and action which tend to change the legal status of Jerusalem are invalid and cannot change that status and urgently called upon Israel to rescind all such measures already taken and to desist forthwith from taking any further action which tends to change the status of Jerusalem.

The resolution passed with 13 votes to none; Canada and the United States abstained.

See also
Arab–Israeli conflict
List of United Nations Security Council Resolutions 201 to 300 (1965–1971)

References

External links
 

 0252
 0252
 0252
 0252
1968 in Israel
May 1968 events